Daniel Robert de Jesus (14 February 1982 – 9 April 2010) was a Brazilian professional footballer.

Career
Robert spent the majority of his career playing in his native Brazil, with a short stint with Mexican side U.N.A.M. in 2009.

Death
During the pre-match warm up before FC Irtysh Pavlodar's Kazakhstan Premier League fixture against FC Kairat on 9 April 2010, Robert collapsed, and died after suffering a heart attack.

References

External links

1982 births
2010 deaths
Brazilian footballers
Association football players who died while playing
Brazilian expatriate footballers
Expatriate footballers in Kazakhstan
Brazilian expatriate sportspeople in Kazakhstan
Association football forwards
Horizonte Futebol Clube players
Sport deaths in Kazakhstan
Footballers from São Paulo